Stell is a surname. Notable people with the surname include:

Aaron Stell (1911–1996), American film editor
Barry Stell (born 1961), English footballer
Christopher Stell (1929–2014), Architectural historian noted for his work on English nonconformist chapels
Gypsie Ann Evarts Stell (born 1927), American film and television actress (better known as Phyllis Coates)
Joe Stell (born 1928), American politician
Philip Stell (1934–2004), British surgeon and historian

See also 
 Stell Andersen (1897–1989), international concert pianist
 Stell Haggas (1856–1926), English first-class cricketer
 Robert Stell Heflin (1815–1901), American legislator for Georgia and Alabama

References